Temirgoy or Chemirgoy or Kemgui (or , ; or , ;) are one of the twelve major Circassian tribes, representing one of the twelve stars on the green-and-gold Circassian flag. They lived between the lower flows of the Belaya and Laba Rivers and their lands extended north to the Kuban. After the end of the Caucasian War, most Temirgoys resettled in other Circassian villages (Bzhedugii, Kabarda, Urupskiy (Schhaschefyzh) current Assumption district of Krasnodar region), as well as in Turkey and the Middle East. In Turkey many of the population of the village Hadzhimukohabl (now village Dondukovskaya ), are Temirgoy.

They live mainly in Adygea and present diaspora. The Temirgoy dialect of Adyghe, and the Bzhedug dialect of Adyghe are the main languages of the Circassians in the Republic of Adygea.

History

The Temirgoys were one of the strongest and most powerful Circassian tribes. Sources note that Temirgoy tribe was richer than its neighbors. They cultivated cattle breeding and agriculture: millet, corn, wheat, rye and sunflower. Class differentiation in Temirgoy tribe was very clear. The most important family of princely origin was Bolotoko, which at some point controlled Temirgoy, Yegeruko and Mamheg tribes. After the Caucasian war many Temirgoy left for Turkey.

See also
 Circassians#Tribes
 Shapsugs
 Bzhedug
 Abzakhs
 Zhaney
 Mamkhegh
 Natukhai
 Hatuqwai
 Besleney

References

Peoples of the Caucasus
Circassian tribes
Ethnic groups in Russia
Adygea
Ethnic groups in Turkey
Muslim communities of the Caucasus